João Costa may refer to:

 João Costa, Piauí, Brazil
 João Costa (fencer) (1920–2010), Portuguese fencer
 João Costa (sport shooter) (born 1964), Portuguese sports shooter
 João Costa (footballer, born 1996), Portuguese footballer who played as a goalkeeper
 João Resende Costa (1910–2007), Brazilian Roman Catholic bishop
 João Cruz Costa, a Brazilian philosopher

Costa, Joao